Oregon Episcopal School (OES) is an American private, coeducational, college preparatory, day and boarding school in the Raleigh Hills area of Portland, Oregon. It was preceded by St. Helen's Hall, a day and boarding school for girls established in 1869. OES was established in 1972 when the girls school merged with Bishop Dagwell Hall.

History

Oregon Episcopal School (OES) was known as St. Helen's Hall at the time of its founding and was originally a boarding and day school for girls. It was established in 1869 in Portland, Oregon by the Rt. Rev. Benjamin Wistar Morris, Bishop of Oregon, and is "the oldest Episcopal school west of the Rocky Mountains."

OES's original site at 4th and Madison is now the location of Portland's City Hall. The school moved several times during its first century to different locations in downtown Portland. It was located at 13th and Hall Streets before moving to its present location in the Raleigh Hills neighborhood of Portland in 1964. The Bishop Dagwell Hall was soon added, expanding the academic program to boys.

In 1972, St. Helen's Hall merged with Bishop Dagwell Hall to become Oregon Episcopal School. Currently, the school serves children from prekindergarten through 12th grade and includes day-school and boarding programs.

A number of facilities have been added over the years. Meyer Hall was built in 1996 as a new facility for Middle School students; the Drinkward Center for Math, Science and Technology opened in 2003; and in 2016 a 45,000-square-foot Lower School facility opened for Pre-K through 5th grade students. Today, approximately 870 students in Pre-K through Grade 12 attend OES.

Academics
The Beginning, Lower, and Middle schools consist entirely of day students, but the Upper School includes a boarding program. Approximately one-fifth of the Upper School's student body resides on campus, and around three-fourths of those boarding students hail from outside the United States.

In 2007, Portland Monthly magazine named the school as one of the best in Oregon. In 2014, Oregon Episcopal School was ranked the best high school in the state of Oregon and the 13th best private school in the United States. OES ranked #2 on Oregon's 25 Best K-12 Schools for 2018, according to the Portland Business Journal.

Science research
OES's research-based science program has a long history of success in science research competitions. Over the years, many students have placed highly in prestigious competitions such as the Intel Science Talent Search, the Siemens Competition, the Davidson Fellows Scholarship, the Google Science Fair, the Intel International Science and Engineering Fair, the Stockholm Junior Water Prize, the International Sustainable World Energy Engineering Environment Project Olympiad, the BioGENIOUS Competition, and the National Junior Science and Humanities Symposium. Since 1995, 19 students have been named Intel National Semifinalists and National Finalists with one senior National Finalist contestant placed 2nd nationally among 40 national finalists in 2003 and one senior National Finalist contestant placed 3rd nationally in 2004. Since 2002, 36 students have been named Siemens National Semifinalists, Regional Finalists and National Finalists. In 2010, Akash Krishnan and Matthew Fernandez placed 1st nationally in the team category and won the Siemens Competition. Also in 2013, Ajay Krishnan was named the recipient of a prestigious $10,000 Davidson Fellows Scholarship, the top honor in the engineering category. He was also named a regional finalist in the Google Science Fair. In 2021 OES's aerospace team won the national Team America Rocketry Challenge.

Facilities 
OES's 59-acre campus lies in the hills of Southwest Portland. Facilities include:
 Meyer Hall: Built in 1996 for Middle School students. Topped by a "green" roof with soil and plants in 2006.
 Drinkward Center for Math, Science and Technology: Opened in 2003. Serves as a facility for STEM related fields in the Upper School.
 Bishop Dagwell Hall: This is OES's fine arts building. This building was the boys school at OES that later merged with St Helens Hall in 1960 to form OES.
 Lower School: The 45,000-square-foot facility for Pre-K through 5th grade students was completed in 2016.
 Ferris Hall: This building was the old OES lower school, but due to the new lower school building being constructed in 2016 Ferris Hall is now a shared space with three main areas. This building was initially slated for demolition after the lower school was constructed, but due to the need for more space this never happened. These are:
 EC3 Design Center: Founded in 2017 this facilities mission statement is to cultivate curiosity and creativity while collaborating with peers. This facility is used by the whole school and is composed of three rooms: Think (lounge), Make (Maker space) and Move (used for performance arts).
 Ferris Hall Athletics: Ferris Hall athletics is composed of an exercise gym and a dance studio.
 Lower School: Some lower school classes are still held in parts of Ferris Hall.
 Jackson and Rodney Houses: Founded in 1963 these are OESs two student dormitories. As a boarding school OES houses 60 boarding students.
 OES Athletic Center: Opened September 2021 this building includes two courts, one named after Kris Van Hatcher and the other, main court named after the Morissette family. These courts are mainly used for basketball and volleyball as well as other miscellaneous activities. The OES athletic center was constructed using sustainable wood and is doted with solar panels and large windows, these building choices make it 82% more efficient than gyms of similar characteristics.

Athletics

Mascot 
OES's official mascot is an Aardvark, chosen by the student body to replace their previous mascot, a falcon. At one time an eagle was also a mascot at the school.

In 2013, the mascot placed second in the West in USA Today's High School Sports' Best Mascot competition.

State championships played or won
 Men's lacrosse: 2004, 2009, 2017, 2018
 Women's lacrosse: 2017
 Women's soccer: 1993, 2005, 2011, 2012, 2014, 2015, 2016, 2017, 2018
 Women's volleyball: 2006
 Women's Cross Country: 1988
 Women's tennis: 1984, 1985, 1986, 1993, 1995, 2008, 2009, 2010, 2012, 2013, 2014, 2018
 Men's tennis: 1983, 1984, 1993, 1994, 2006, 2007, 2008, 2009, 2012, 2013, 2014, 2015, 2016, 2017, 2018
 Men's soccer: 2005, 2006, 2007, 2009, 2013, 2014, 2022 
 Oregon Style Cross‐Examination Debate: 2016
 Oregon Battle of the Books: 2013, 2014, 2015, 2016
 Speech and Debate: 2018
 Men’s Golf: 2019 2022 
 Men's Basketball: 2020

Disaster on Mount Hood
One of the worst climbing accidents in U.S. history occurred in May 1986 when seven sophomore students and two faculty froze to death while climbing Mount Hood. Of the four survivors, three had life-threatening injuries. One had his legs amputated. The OES disaster spurred the development of the Mountain Locator Unit, an inexpensive transmitter which helps searchers find climbers in distress.

Notable alumni
 Harriet Fitch Luckett, a teacher who served as one of the first women to serve in the Idaho House of Representatives
 Clara C. Munson, 1880 – mayor of Warrenton, Oregon and one of the state's earliest women elected to office
 Vivian Marshall, 1906 – vaudeville and film actress
 Alma Francis – Broadway and silent film actress 
 Betsy Johnson - member of the Oregon House of Representatives and Oregon Senate
 Ben Westlund, 1967 – Oregon State Treasurer
 Virginia Euwer Wolff, 1955 – writer
 Peter Holmstrom, 1987 – musician, The Dandy Warhols
 Tianhui Michael Li, 2003 – Data scientist and Tech entrepreneur
 John Robinson, 2005 – actor

References

Boarding schools in Oregon
Education in Portland, Oregon
Educational institutions established in 1869
High schools in Washington County, Oregon
Private middle schools in Oregon
Schools accredited by the Northwest Accreditation Commission
Private elementary schools in Oregon
Private high schools in Oregon
1869 establishments in Oregon
Episcopal schools in the United States